England national rugby team may refer to:

Rugby union
 England national rugby union team, administered by the Rugby Football Union
 England women's national rugby union team, administered by the Rugby Football Union
 England national rugby sevens team compete in the World Sevens Series
 England women's national rugby sevens team compete in the World Sevens Series

Rugby league
 England national rugby league team, often nicknamed the Three Lions, administered by the Rugby Football League
 England Knights, formerly Emerging England or England 'A'
 England women's national rugby league team

England national rugby league team may erroneously refer to:
 Great Britain national rugby league team, nicknamed the Lions, representing the entirety of the British Isles, also administered by the Rugby Football League